Marcelo André da Veiga Lopes (born 21 April 1994) is a Portuguese footballer  who plays as a winger for Liga I club FC Voluntari.

Football career
On 29 July 2017, Lopes made his professional debut with Real in a 2017–18 Taça da Liga match against Belenenses.

Personal life
Born in Portugal, Lopes is of Cape Verdean descent.

Honours

Real SC
Campeonato de Portugal: 2016–17

FC Voluntari
Cupa României runner-up: 2021–22

References

External links

 
Portuguese League profile 

1994 births
Living people
People from Oeiras, Portugal
Portuguese people of Cape Verdean descent
Portuguese footballers
Association football forwards
Campeonato de Portugal (league) players
Liga Portugal 2 players
Segunda Divisão players
Real S.C. players
Eerste Divisie players
FC Eindhoven players
Liga I players
FC Voluntari players
Portuguese expatriate footballers
Portuguese expatriate sportspeople in the Netherlands
Expatriate footballers in the Netherlands
Portuguese expatriate sportspeople in Romania
Expatriate footballers in Romania
Sportspeople from Lisbon District